Erich Büttner may refer to:

 Erich Büttner (painter) (1889–1936), German painter
 Erich Büttner (pilot) (died 1945), German World War II fighter ace